Heidi M. Cullen is the Director of Communications and Strategic Initiatives at MBARI, the Monterey Bay Aquarium Research Institute .   Cullen was previously the chief scientist for the non-profit environmental organization, Climate Central, located in Princeton, New Jersey.  In addition, she is a guest lecturer at nearby Princeton University, and the author of the book, The Weather of the Future. An expert and commentator about issues related to climate change and the environment, she was an on-air personality at The Weather Channel, and is a senior research fellow at the University of Pennsylvania (Penn).

Life and career
Born in Staten Island, New York, Cullen received a B.S. in industrial engineering and operations research, from Columbia University, followed by a doctorate in climatology and ocean-atmosphere dynamics from the Lamont–Doherty Earth Observatory, also at Columbia.

Subsequent to her educational experiences, Cullen worked at the National Center for Atmospheric Research (NCAR), located in Boulder, Colorado. While there, she was given a fellowship from the National Oceanic and Atmospheric Administration (NOAA) to return to Columbia University, where she worked at the university's International Research Institute for Climate and Society.  The fellowship allowed her to contribute to a project which looked at the effect of climate on water resources in Brazil and Paraguay.

After her fellowship, Cullen joined The Weather Channel, becoming their initial expert on climate change topics.  In October 2006 she previewed her 30-minute program, The Climate Code. In April of the following year, along with a broadband program, The Climate Code would change to an hour format, and be retitled, Forecast Earth; Cullen was part of the creation process of both shows. In November 2008, NBC, the parent company of The Weather Channel, cancelled the program.

After leaving The Weather Channel, Cullen became the chief climatologist for the not-for-profit organization, Climate Central, where she issues reports on climate topics.  In addition to her responsibilities at Climate Central, she lectures at nearby Princeton University, and is a senior research fellow at the Penn's Wharton Risk Management and Decision Processes Center.  In 2010 she authored the book, The Weather of the Future, which gives one perspective of what different locations might look in the year 2050 based upon current climate modeling theories.  She also had the role of chief science advisor for the Showtime series, The Years of Living Dangerously. She is also currently a member of the Science Advisory Board for NOAA, and sits on the Council of the American Meteorological Society.

Awards and accreditations
2019 - Friend of the Planet Award - National Center for Science Education.
2017 - Rachel Carson Award - Audubon Society
2008 - National Conservationist Award for Science - National Wildlife Federation
Associate Editor - Weather, Climate, Society
American Geophysical Union - member
American Meteorological Society - member
Society of Environmental Journalists - member

See also
 Scientific opinion on climate change

Selected publications

 What Weather Is the Fault of Climate Change? March 11, 2016 New York Times

References

External links 
 
About Heidi Cullen Web

Living people
American climatologists
Women climatologists
American non-fiction environmental writers
Sustainability advocates
Women earth scientists
American women scientists
Columbia School of Engineering and Applied Science alumni
National Center for Atmospheric Research faculty
Place of birth missing (living people)
Year of birth missing (living people)
21st-century American women writers
American women academics